Bruno Audebrand (born March 2, 1968, in France) is a former professional footballer.

References
Bruno Audebrand profile at chamoisfc79.fr

1968 births
Living people
French footballers
Association football defenders
Chamois Niortais F.C. players
FC Martigues players
Ligue 1 players
Ligue 2 players